Anfimov Mocheg is a river in the Maslyaninsky District of Novosibirsk Oblast. The river flows into the Berd. Its length is 14 km (8.7 mi).

The tributaries of the river are the Abramov Mocheg and Severny Mocheg.

References

External links
 Государственный водный реестр: река Анфимов Мочег. State Water Register: Anfimov Mocheg.

Rivers of Novosibirsk Oblast